George Noel Watson (1884–1980) known as Noel was a manager  and later the secretary of Nottingham Forest.

Watson was also a referee who took charge of the 1925 FA Cup Final between Sheffield United and Cardiff City at Wembley. He also refereed international matches in the 1920s and 30s.

Watson was manager of Nottingham Forest between 1932 and 1936.

See also 
1925 FA Cup Final

References 

English football referees
English Football League referees
FA Cup Final referees
Nottingham Forest F.C. managers
1884 births
1980 deaths